McCluskey or McCloskey (Irish: Mac Bhloscaidh) is an Irish surname. It evolved as a branch of the Ó Catháin clan in County Londonderry.

History

The McCluskey sept are a branch of the O'Cahans, the former Lords of Keenaght. The McCluskey family was one of the leading Clans of Ulster before the 16th century Scottish colonisation. The MacCloskeys are from County Londonderry and descend from one Bloskey O'Kane, slayer of Murtagh O'Loughlin heir to the Irish Throne in 1196. The names as McCloskey or McCluskey are well known in America and have been used in popular culture. The first recorded spelling of the family name McCluskey is shown to be that of Mac Bhloscaidh from the All Ireland Census in 1659, conducted during the reign of Richard Cromwell. Surnames became necessary in the Celtic 
Isles when governments introduced personal taxation.

It was first found in what is modern County Londonderry where they were a branch of the O'Kanes. It originates from Gaelic Ireland in the North and the South.

People with the surname
Andy McCluskey (born 1959), singer
Conn McCluskey (1914–2013), Irish civil-rights activist
C. Wade McClusky (1902–1976), American admiral
Edward J. McCluskey (1929–2016), electrical engineer
George McCluskey (born 1957), Scottish football player
Harold McCluskey (1912–1987), radiation survivor
Jamie McCluskey (born 1987), Scottish football player
Jill McCluskey, American economist
Jim McCluskey (1950–2013), Scottish football referee
Joe McCluskey (1911–2002), American athlete
John McCluskey, Baron McCluskey (1929–2017), Scottish lawyer, judge and politician
John McCluskey (boxer) (1944–2015), Scottish boxer of the 1960s and '70s
Len McCluskey (born 1950), a British trade unionist
Pat McCluskey (born 1952), Scottish football player
Roger McCluskey (1930–1993), American race-car driver
Ronnie McCluskey (1936–2011), Scottish football player
Stuart McCluskey (born 1977), Scottish football player

Fictional characters
Karen McCluskey, Desperate Housewives character
Mona McCluskey, American sitcom
Mrs. Bridget McCluskey, Grange Hill character played by Gwyneth Powell
Captain Mark McCluskey, corrupt Irish-American police captain played by Sterling Hayden in The Godfather
Gator McKlusky, character played by Burt Reynolds in the movies White Lightning and Gator

See also
McCluskie
McCloskey
McClusky (disambiguation)

References

Surnames of Irish origin
Anglicised Irish-language surnames